Human Genetics is a peer-reviewed medical journal covering all aspects of human genetics, including legal and social issues. It was established in 1964 by Arno Motulsky and Friedrich Vogel as the German-language Humangenetik, obtaining its current title in 1976. 
It is published by Springer Science+Business Media.
Its editors-in-chief are  David N. Cooper (Cardiff University) and Thomas J. Hudson (Ontario Institute for Cancer Research). According to the Journal Citation Reports, the journal has a 2018 impact factor of 5.20.

Ethics scandal
The journal published findings exploring the DNA of physical appearance traits of Uighur men from Tumxuk in 2019. One of the authors  of the paper on DNA phenotyping said he had been unaware of the origins of the DNA samples.

References

External links 
 

Medical genetics journals
Springer Science+Business Media academic journals
Publications established in 1964
English-language journals
Biweekly journals